What Am I Waiting For is the only solo studio album from American country music singer Heidi Newfield, formerly the lead vocalist in the group Trick Pony. It was released on August 5, 2008 on Curb Records and produced by Tony Brown. The album's lead-off single, "Johnny & June", peaked at number 11 on the Hot Country Songs charts. This song was followed by "Cry, Cry ('Til the Sun Shines)", which peaked at number 29. What Am I Waiting For debuted on the Billboard 200 at number 10 with 34,000 copies sold in its first week.

Content
"Johnny & June" is the first single release from this album. Co-written by Newfield, Stephony Smith and Deanna Bryant, this song peaked at number 11 on the Billboard country singles charts in late 2008. Following it is the number 29-peaking "Cry Cry ('Til the Sun Shines)", which Martina McBride previously recorded on her 2007 album Waking Up Laughing. The album's title track, the third single, debuted in May 2009 at number 57 before falling off the chart and re-entered the charts at number 60 in June 2009. Both it and "Nothin' Burns Like a Memory" were co-written by Ira Dean and Keith Burns, with whom Newfield previously performed as the trio Trick Pony from 1996 to 2006. Also covered on this album is "Can't Let Go", originally recorded by Lucinda Williams on her album Car Wheels on a Gravel Road.

Reception

The album has received mixed critical reviews, with favorable reviews focusing on Newfield's singing as well as the range of material in comparison to her work in Trick Pony. Ken Tucker of Billboard gave a favorable review, saying that the album showed a broader scope in subject material than the party-oriented material that she recorded in Trick Pony. Tucker thought that Brown's production worked well with the project and helped Newfield to expand her musical range. Dawn Pomento of Country Standard Time gave a favorable review as well, saying that many of the songs were strengthened by Newfield's "muscular and lithe" voice and Brown's production. About.com review Matt Sexton rated the album four stars out of five, saying that "Can't Let Go" and "Knocked Up" showed Newfield's blues influences.

Matt C., reviewing the album for Engine 145, gave it three-and-a-half stars out of five, saying that the first several tracks were ambitious, but that the album contained several weak tracks on the latter half. He highlighted "Johnny & June" as a standout track, even though he thought that its impact was diminished by previous singles whose titles were also the names of singers. "Cry Cry", which he called a "puerile self-help anthem", and "Nothing Burns Like a Memory", which he thought clashed with the album's tone, are cited in his review as the weakest tracks. Allmusic critic Thom Jurek gave it two-and-a-half out of five. Although he said that the album had generally strong songwriting throughout, and referred to Newfield as a "kinetic vocalist", Jurek thought that the album was largely overproduced and lacked a distinctive sound as a result.

Track listing

Personnel
As listed in liner notes.

Ashley Cleveland – background vocals
Leslie Craig – background vocals
Dan Dugmore – lap steel guitar, pedal steel guitar
Kenny Greenberg – electric guitar
Wes Hightower – background vocals
Kim Keyes – background vocals
Greg Morrow – drums
Steve Nathan – piano, Wurlitzer, synthesizer
Heidi Newfield – lead vocals
Kim Parent – background vocals
Chris Rodriguez – background vocals
Eric Silver – background vocals
Stephony Smith – background vocals
Judson Spence – background vocals
Ilya Toshinsky – acoustic guitar, banjo, mandolin
Glenn Worf – bass guitar
Reese Wynans – Hammond B-3 organ, Wurlitzer
Jonathan Yudkin – cello on "Johnny & June"

Chart performance

Weekly charts

Year-end charts

Singles

References

2008 debut albums
Curb Records albums
Heidi Newfield albums
Albums produced by Tony Brown (record producer)